This article ranks human languages by their number of native speakers.

However, all such rankings should be used with caution, because it is not possible to devise a coherent set of linguistic criteria for distinguishing languages in a dialect continuum.
For example, a language is often defined as a set of varieties that are mutually intelligible, but independent national standard languages may be considered to be separate languages even though they are largely mutually intelligible, as in the case of Danish and Norwegian.
Conversely, many commonly accepted languages, including German, Italian and even English, encompass varieties that are not mutually intelligible.
While Arabic is sometimes considered a single language centred on Modern Standard Arabic, other authors describe its mutually unintelligible varieties as separate languages.
Similarly, Chinese is sometimes viewed as a single language because of a shared culture and common literary language.
It is also common to describe various Chinese dialect groups, such as Mandarin, Wu and Yue, as languages, even though each of these groups contains many mutually unintelligible varieties.

There are also difficulties in obtaining reliable counts of speakers, which vary over time because of population change and language shift.
In some areas, there is no reliable census data, the data is not current, or the census may not record languages spoken, or record them ambiguously.
Sometimes speaker populations are exaggerated for political reasons, or speakers of minority languages may be under-reported in favour of a national language.

Top languages by population

Ethnologue (2023, 26th edition)
The following languages are listed as having at least 50 million first-language speakers in the 2023 edition of Ethnologue. Entries identified by Ethnologue as macrolanguages (such as Arabic, Lahnda, Persian, Malay, Pashto, and Chinese, encompassing all their respective varieties) are not included in this section.

CIA (2018 estimates) 
According to the CIA, the most-spoken first languages in 2018 were:

See also

 List of languages by total number of speakers
 List of sign languages by number of native signers
 List of languages by the number of countries in which they are recognized as an official language
 Number of languages by country
 Languages used on the Internet
 List of ISO 639-3 codes
 Lists of languages
 List of European languages by number of speakers
 Global language system
 Linguistic diversity index
 World language

Notes

References

External links
 The Ethnologue's most recent list of languages by total number of speakers – this is not a list of native speakers
 Languages Spoken by More Than 10 Million People (Archived 2009-10-31) – Encarta list, based on data from Ethnologue, but some figures (e.g. for Arabic) widely vary from it

Number of Native Speakers